The white-hooded babbler (Gampsorhynchus rufulus) is a species of bird in the family Pellorneidae.

It is found from the eastern Himalayas to central Myanmar and southwestern China. Its natural habitats are subtropical or tropical moist lowland forest and subtropical or tropical moist montane forest.

References

Collar, N. J. & Robson, C. 2007. Family Timaliidae (Babblers)  pp. 70 – 291 in; del Hoyo, J., Elliott, A. & Christie, D.A. eds. Handbook of the Birds of the World, Vol. 12. Picathartes to Tits and Chickadees. Lynx Edicions, Barcelona.

white-hooded babbler
Birds of Eastern Himalaya
Birds of Myanmar
white-hooded babbler
white-hooded babbler
Taxonomy articles created by Polbot